Interpol Calling is a British television crime drama series produced by Rank Organisation and Jack Wrather Productions for ITC Entertainment. The programme, which ran for one series of 39 half-hour monochrome episodes, followed the adventures of Interpol policemen Duval and Mornay as they fought against international drug-running, homicide, robbery and forgery.

Series outline
Opening titles voiceover:

"Crime knows no frontiers. To combat the growing menace of the international criminal, the police forces of the world have opened up their own national boundaries. At their headquarters in Paris, scientifically equipped to match the speed of the jet age, sixty-three nations have linked together to form the International Criminal Police Organisation, INTERPOL!"

Main cast

 Charles Korvin as Inspector Paul Duval
 Edwin Richfield as Inspector Jean Mornay

Recurring characters;
 Roland Bartrop as Grimond, French police
 George Pastell as Pagano, Italian police
Guest stars included Mai Zetterling, Patrick Troughton, David Kossoff, Warren Mitchell, Nanette Newman, and Donald Pleasence.

Episode list
Broadcast date is for ATV Midlands ITV regions varied date and order. Production number from PDF summary of episodes on the Network DVD.

.

DVD release
Network released the series on DVD in December 2010. Episodes 25 and 30 have the end credits reversed.

References

External links
 
 TV.com

1950s British crime television series
1960s British crime television series
Television series by ITC Entertainment
ITV television dramas
Films shot at Pinewood Studios
British detective television series
1950s British drama television series
1960s British drama television series
Black-and-white British television shows
English-language television shows
Works about Interpol